Mark "Conan" Stevens is an Australian actor and former professional wrestler. He is 213 cm (7’) tall.

Career
Stevens portrayed giant green swamp creature of Man-Thing in Marvel's Man-Thing film and Gregor Clegane ("The Mountain") in the first season of the HBO television series Game of Thrones. He was cast to portray Bolg, son of Azog, in Peter Jackson's Hobbit trilogy, and completed a portion of the films' photography in makeup as the character. He was subsequently replaced in the role by Lord of the Rings trilogy veteran Lawrence Makoare when Bolg was revamped into a completely CGI character. He ended up playing an unnamed Gundabad Orc, called "Keeper of the Dungeons" in The Hobbit: The Battle of the Five Armies.

Stevens co-wrote the 2009 martial arts film, Bangkok Adrenaline.

Filmography

Television

Championships and accomplishments
International Wrestling Australia
IWA Heavyweight Championship (2 time)

References

External links 
 
 
 MJ Snow, HBOWatch.com

Living people
Australian male film actors
Australian people of English descent
Australian people of German descent
Male actors from New South Wales
People from Newcastle, New South Wales
Australian stunt performers
Australian bodybuilders
Australian male professional wrestlers
Australian expatriates in the Philippines
1969 births

GMA Network personalities